Mallika is a 1957 Indian Tamil-language film directed by Joseph Thaliath Jr. The film stars Gemini Ganesan and Padmini. It was released on 19 July 1957, and remade in Hindi as Payal the same year.

Plot 
Kamala and Padma are the daughters of a businessman stationed in Burma. Due to losses, the businessman is forced to return to India with his wife and daughters. The plane crashes and the parents are killed. Padma, the younger daughter, loses her eyesight. Kamala joins a dance troupe for a living and to save for treatment of her sister. Kamala meets Mohan, a man from an affluent family, and falls in love with him. But Mohan's parents are against the marriage because Kamala is a dancer and they consider her as someone of low moral character. Mohan's father is murdered and Mohan is arrested. Kamala takes the blame on to herself in order to save Mohan. The truth is eventually revealed, Padma regains her sight and all ends well for everyone.

Cast 
Credits adapted from The Hindu:
 R. Ganesh as Mohan
 Padmini as Kamala
 T. S. Balaiah
 K. A. Thangavelu
 M. N. Rajam
 T. V. Kumudhini
 Baby Rajakumari as Padma
 Lakshmirajam
 N. S. Narayana Pillai
 Peer Mohamed
 Sharma
 Ganapathi Bhat
 P. B. Vairam

Production 
This is the first film produced by the Citadel Films Corporation owned by Joseph Thaliath Jr, who also directed the film. Nanjilnadu T. N. Rajappa, who wrote the dialogues, also worked as the assistant director. Hiralal choreographed Padmini's dances, and was assisted by Chinni and Sampath. M. G. Naidu, who later founded the Naidu Hall, worked as the costume designer on the film.

Soundtrack 
The music was composed by T. R. Pappa and the lyrics were written by A. Maruthakasi and M. K. Athmanathan. The playback singers were P. Susheela, A. M. Raja, Jikki, Mythili, S. C. Krishnan and R. Nageswara Rao.

Reception 
Kanthan of Kalki positively reviewed Mallika. Despite this, the film was an average success, but was remade in Hindi as Payal the same year with Padmini returning.

References

External links 
 

1950s Tamil-language films
1957 films
Films directed by Joseph Thaliath Jr.
Films scored by T. R. Pappa
Indian black-and-white films
Tamil films remade in other languages